The Ida is a left tributary of the river Bodva in eastern Slovakia. It flows into the Bodva in the village Peder.

References

Rivers of Slovakia